
Gmina Iwanowice is a rural gmina (administrative district) in Kraków County, Lesser Poland Voivodeship, in southern Poland.

The gmina contains part of the protected area called Dłubnia Landscape Park.

Villages
Gmina Iwanowice contains the villages and settlements of Biskupice, Celiny, Damice, Domiarki, Grzegorzowice Małe, Grzegorzowice Wielkie, Iwanowice, Iwanowice Dworskie, Krasieniec Zakupny, Lesieniec, Maszków, Narama, Poskwitów, Poskwitów Stary, Przestańsko, Sieciechowice, Stary Krasieniec, Sułkowice, Widoma, Władysław, Zagaje, Zalesie and Żerkowice.

Neighbouring gminas
Gmina Iwanowice is bordered by the gminas of Gołcza, Kocmyrzów-Luborzyca, Michałowice, Skała, Słomniki and Zielonki.

References
Polish official population figures 2006

Iwanowice
Kraków County